Erik Adolf Efraim "Erik Aber" Abrahamsson (28 January 1898 – 19 May 1965) was a Swedish athlete. He won the national long jump title in 1921–1923 and a bronze medal at the 1920 Summer Olympics. He was also an acclaimed bandy and ice hockey player, part of the Swedish team that won the 1921 European Championships.

In 1914 Abrahamsson started playing bandy with Södertälje SK (SSK). Later he took up ice hockey in 1921 and played with AIK, IFK Stockholm, and the Swedish national ice hockey team, winning the Ice Hockey European Championship 1921. Together with his elder brother Carl, Abrahamsson managed to convince the Södertälje SK board of directors to incorporate ice hockey in the club in 1925. The club is still a major team in Sweden's major league, Elitserien. Later, in the same year 1925, SSK played in the Swedish championship final for the first time, and SSK won the title as Swedish champions, with Abrahamsson in the team and after his brother scored the gaming winning goal against Västerås SK.

References

1898 births
1965 deaths
Athletes (track and field) at the 1920 Summer Olympics
Medalists at the 1920 Summer Olympics
Olympic bronze medalists for Sweden
Olympic bronze medalists in athletics (track and field)
Olympic athletes of Sweden
Södertälje SK players
Swedish ice hockey players
Swedish male long jumpers
People from Södertälje
Sportspeople from Stockholm County